Ben Wolo served as the Managing Director, and a board member of Liberia Telecommunications Corporation. He also served as Head Director of Engineering and Operations at Qwest. He holds degrees in Engineering and Computer Science from New York Institute of Technology.

References

New York Institute of Technology alumni
Living people
Year of birth missing (living people)